Jose Lucas Caetano da Silva (born 7 March 1994), commonly known as Zé Lucas, is a Brazilian footballer who currently plays for Maltese side Pietà Hotspurs.

Club career
Zé Lucas started his career with PSTC Londrina of his hometown, before moving to Fluminense in 2012. In his first year with the Laranjeiras-based side, he scored the winning goal against Botafogo to win the youth version of the Taça Guanabara. He was also top scorer in the whole state of Rio de Janeiro.

He was loaned to Botafogo in 2014, and spent the whole year with the club's youth team. He went to America in 2015 to study at university and improve his English, however he was rejected a scholarship as he had already played professionally. As a result of this, he remained with Fluminense, and joined Slovakian side STK Samorin on loan in 2016, and scored 6 goals as they won the 3. Liga.

Following Fluminense's affiliate link with Stal Mielec in 2015, Zé Lucas was announced to have permanently joined the Polish side. He made his debut in a Polish Cup game against Chojniczanka Chojnice, playing 90 minutes in a 0–2 defeat.

After two league appearances, Zé Lucas returned to Brazil to join Campeonato Paulista Segunda Divisão side Itararé.

Pietà Hotspurs

Career statistics

Club

Notes

References

External links
Zé Lucas at MFA

1994 births
Living people
Brazilian footballers
Brazilian expatriate footballers
Association football forwards
2. Liga (Slovakia) players
I liga players
Fluminense FC players
FC ŠTK 1914 Šamorín players
Stal Mielec players
Qormi F.C. players
Żebbuġ Rangers F.C. players
Pietà Hotspurs F.C. players
Brazilian expatriate sportspeople in Poland
Expatriate footballers in Poland
Brazilian expatriate sportspeople in Malta
Expatriate footballers in Malta
Sportspeople from Londrina